Collide is the fourteenth studio album by American R&B group Boyz II Men. It was released by MSM Music Group and BMG Rights Management on October 21, 2014.

Critical reception

Andy Kellman of AllMusic said, "This is easily the group's most scattered album, as it offers various shades of ballads, some throwbacks, oddly escapist adult alternative fare, and even anthemic rockers. Many of them blur the line between fresh changes of pace and ill-suited switch-ups. "Already Gone," one that falls toward the latter, is schizophrenic itself, as it bounds between early-'80s arena rock and EDM. It's also one of many songs in which Auto-Tune is used—easily the album's most baffling characteristic."

Track listing
Credits adapted from the album's liner notes.

Notes
 denotes a co-producer

Charts

Release history

References

2014 albums
Boyz II Men albums